Destinies of Women is an East German film. It was released in 1952, and sold more than 5,100,000 tickets.  It was produced as a propaganda film which compared the lives of women in the two sides of divided Germany.  The women in East Berlin were politically aware and organized while those in West Berlin were vain and materialistic.

Cast 
 Sonja Sutter - Renate Ludwig
 Lotte Loebinger - Hertha Scholz
 Anneliese Book - Barbara Berg
  - Anni Neumann
  - Isa von Trautwald
 Gertrud Meyen - Betty Vogt
 Maly Delschaft - Frau Ludwig
 Angela Brunner - Ursula Krenz
  - Gertrud Neumann
  - Prosecutor
  - Frau Becker
 Karla Runkehl - Freundin von Renate

References

External links
 

1952 films
East German films
Films set in Berlin
Films directed by Slatan Dudow
1950s German films
Women in Berlin